Memory 99 is an outdoor steel sculpture by Lee Kelly, located at the North Park Blocks in downtown Portland, Oregon.

Description and history
Memory 99, a 4,000-pound Corten steel sculpture designed by Lee Kelly, is installed at the North Park Blocks at the front steps of the 511 Federal Building (511 Northwest Broadway), which houses the Pacific Northwest College of Art's (PNCA) Arlene and Harold Schnitzer Center for Art and Design. The sculpture was dedicated by PNCA on October 19, 2012.

Reception
Portland Monthly called the sculpture's design "sweetly curved yet architecturally stark", and said it serves as a "marvelous example of the work that has made [Kelly] one of the most in demand artists in the region.

References

External links

 Memory 99, Elizabeth Leach Gallery
 Memory 99 Dedication Ceremony at Future North Park Block (September 26, 2012), Pacific Northwest College of Art
 Sculpture unveiled at newest North Park Block (October 19, 2012), KPTV-TV

Outdoor sculptures in Portland, Oregon
Pearl District, Portland, Oregon
Sculptures by Lee Kelly
Steel sculptures in Oregon